After America is a 2021 American drama film, written and directed by Jake Yuzna. Created through an open call in 2019, the film follows a group of criminal justice de-escalation workers in Minneapolis, MN who gather in order to confront the failures they faced in their jobs and personal lives. Employing radical theater workshop techniques devised by Jake Yuzna, this unorthodox group developed a series of interwoven stories based on their real lives. The resulting film merged improvised and devised performances to blur together the usually separate filmmaking traditions of scripted and nonfiction. Looking to collide the stories American's tell themselves with realities they face, the film created a singular portrait of the pain and unrest bubbling under the surface of the American way of life.

Completed one month before the unrest following the murder of George Floyd, "After America" is a snapshot of a Minneapolis struggling to move towards a better future that lies after America.

Premiering in the Breakouts section of the Slamdance Film Festival in 2021.

Cast
 Yvonne Freese
 Theresa McConnon
 Daniel Nies
 Ahmed Ismail Yusuf
 Dan Fox
 Eli Anthony
 Robert Dante
 Sophia Dunn-Walker

References

External links

2021 films
American drama films
2020s English-language films
American LGBT-related films
Films about trans men
2021 LGBT-related films
LGBT-related drama films
Queer-related mass media
2021 drama films
2020s American films